James Kneeland (February 1816, LeRoy, New York – 6 September 1899, Milwaukee, Wisconsin) was a businessman and politician.

Business career
In 1841, Kneeland moved to the Wisconsin Territory, settling in Milwaukee. Kneeland was credited with helping to found the Milwaukee Gas Light Company. He was also a promoter of numerous road and railroad companies, including Milwaukee and Mississippi Railroad.

Political career
Kneeland was a member of the Wisconsin Territorial Council from 1845 to 1846. From 1867 to 1868, he was Tax Commissioner of Milwaukee. He was a Democrat.

References

1816 births
1899 deaths
People from Le Roy, New York
Politicians from Milwaukee
Members of the Wisconsin Territorial Legislature
Tax commissioners
Wisconsin Democrats
19th-century American politicians